Eleven ships and a shore establishment of the Royal Navy have been named HMS Medway, after the River Medway.

 , a 60-gun fourth rate launched in 1693, rebuilt in 1718 and hulked in 1740.  She was beached in 1748 and a sheer hulk and was broken up in 1749.
, a 60-gun fourth rate launched in 1742 and scuttled in 1748.
 , a 60-gun fourth rate launched in 1755.  She was used as a receiving ship after 1787, and was renamed HMS Arundel in 1802. She was broken up in 1811.
 , a 6-gun storeship purchased in 1756.  She was used as a dockyard craft in 1760 and was sold in 1764.
 , a 74-gun third rate launched in 1812.  She was used as a convict ship after 1847, and was sold in 1865.
 , an iron-hulled screw gunboat launched in 1876 and sold in 1904.
 , an  destroyer, originally to have been named HMS Redwing.  This was changed to Medora in 1915, and then Medway before her launch in 1916. She was sold in 1921.
 , were submarine base shore establishments in the Mediterranean, listed between 1942 and 1946.  A number of ships were renamed HMS Medway II whilst serving as depot ships for the establishment, including:
 HMS Talbot, previously  was Medway II between 1944 and 1945.
  was Medway II between 1945 and 1946.
 HMS Medway was the former Landing craft tank .  She was HMS Medway between 1959 and 1970 whilst serving as a submarine depot ship.

See also
 
 

Royal Navy ship names